Ashishkumar Chauhan is an Indian business   executive, administrator and current Chancellor of University of Allahabad. In July 2022, Chauhan is managing director and chief executive officer of National Stock Exchange (NSE). He was the managing director and chief executive officer of the Bombay Stock Exchange (BSE). and his term will complete in November 2022. He also serves as the member of Governing council of one of the premier B school in India - IIM Raipur. Ashish is best known as the father of modern financial derivatives in India, and is considered one of the foremost experts in financial market policies, Information technology, organized retail, telecommunications and Indian social issues.

Early life 
A mechanical engineer from IIT Bombay and alumnus of IIM Calcutta, Chauhan was recruited from the campus as an officer by the Industrial Development Bank of India (now IDBI Bank) in 1991.

Career

National Stock Exchange of India 
His first break came in 1993, when the Government proposed a stock exchange in the National Stock Exchange (NSE). Chauhan was a member of the core team that founded the NSE, and responsible for setting up their equities and derivatives markets from 1993 to 2000.  His work at NSE, involved market operations, membership, clearing and settlement, surveillance, regulations, sales, marketing, IT, premises etc.  Chauhan himself was involved in creating the trading infrastructure at NSE and was instrumental in creating NSE-50 (Nifty), the most traded index in derivatives in India, NSE's certification in Financial Markets (NCFM), IPO through screen and several other innovations in the Indian capital markets.  In addition, he was instrumental in setting up initial Information Technology infrastructure including the first commercial satellite telecom network in India for NSE. He was also involved in conceptualization of National Securities Clearing Corporation (NSCCL) and initial set up of National Securities Depository Limited (NSDL). He  looked at NSE's risk management system along with two others. The team created a metric to measure liquidity in stocks—called impact cost—which is now standard practice. Due to his work in setting up modern exchange traded financial derivatives in Indian markets, he is known as the ‘father of derivatives’ in Indian finance. In July 2022, Chauhan was appointed as managing director and chief executive officer of National Stock Exchange (NSE)

Reliance Industries 
In 2001, Chauhan left NSE to begin his entrepreneurship venture, financed by the Reliance group, and soon began working for Reliance Infocomm. In 2004, Chauhan became the chief information officer (CIO) of Reliance Infocomm, and then the Reliance Group CIO in 2005. He was also the CEO of the cricket team Mumbai Indians, owned by Reliance Industries, in its formative years.

BSE 
After leaving Reliance Industries, Chauhan joined BSE as Deputy CEO in 2009 and was appointed as CEO in 2012. He is credited with reviving BSE including making it the fastest Exchange in the World with less than 6 microseconds response time, introduction of Mobile Trading, state of the art online real time surveillance system, introduction of several market leading products. In addition, he has also been responsible for revamping of BSE, bringing in the entire spectrum of products including equity, currency, interest rate derivatives and commodities to BSE. Under his guidance, BSE has taken leadership position in setting up Small and Medium Enterprises (SME) Platform, Offer for Sale (OFS), Mutual Funds Distribution through Exchanges, e-IPO etc. As of October 2018, BSE commands more than 70% markets share in these segments.

Under Ashish's leadership and vision, in 2012, BSE became the first Exchange in the country to launch a dedicated SME platform for listing of Small and Medium Enterprises (SMEs). As of October 2018, the BSE SME segment is the market leader of its kind in India with about 275 SME listed, 54 of which have grown and successfully migrated to the main Board of the Exchange.

As a big believer of equity inclusion, in 2013 he pushed BSE to develop a Mutual Fund Distribution Platform - BSE StAR MF. This web-based transaction processing platform with fully automated online mutual fund collection & settlement system has become one of the most acceptable platforms in the mutual fund ecosystem. As of October 2018, the BSE StAR-MF platform is India's largest digital platform to distribute Mutual Funds and commands a market share of close to 80% among exchange distributed funds. The robustness and seamlessness of BSE StAR MF along with Swiftness of Distributors query resolution through real time interaction has created an ideal ecosystem for all stakeholders in India Mutual Funds Industry.

He was also instrumental in setting up India's First International Exchange "India International Exchange", which was inaugurated by the Hon'ble Prime Minister of India Shri Narendra Modi in January 2017 at Gandhinagar, Gift City.  India INX is the first exchange to introduce a single platform across multi-assets, equities, commodities, currencies and interest rate derivatives.  It is also the first exchange to launch gold options

In January 2017, he successfully completed the IPO of BSE which was pending for over 10 years. BSE IPO was oversubscribed 51 times, with the public offer received bids for 550.8 million shares against 10.8 million shares on offer.

In October 2018, under the leadership of Ashish, BSE commenced trading in gold and silver contracts to mark its entry into the commodity derivatives segment and become India's first universal stock exchange and currently offers all assets classes, including equity, mutual funds, currency, and commodity in its portfolio.

Awards and honours 

Advisor and member Dalit Indian Chamber of Commerce and Industry (DICCI)
 Distinguished Fellow 2017, Institute of Directors, 
Distinguished Alumnus Award 2016 - IIM Calcutta
 CEO of the Year, Diamond Sabre Awards 2015, Hong Kong
 Indian Business Leader of the Year, Horasis Interlaken/Switzerland 2015
 RH Patil Award for Excellence in Financial Services, June 2015
 Distinguished Alumnus Award, Indian Institute of Technology, Bombay, 2014
 Best CEO in the Financial Markets in the Asia Pacific by the Asian Banker, 2014
 Zee Business Awards- Special contribution in Commodities and Capital Market, 2013
 TOP 50 CIOs, Information Week, US, 2009
He is the Chairperson on the Board of Governors (BoGs) of the  NIT Manipur and an Independent Director of the ICSI Insolvency Professionals Agency, a 100% subsidiary company of The Institute of Company Secretaries of India. He is the Chairman of South Asian Federation of Exchanges (SAFE), a forum of 28 member entities from the SAARC region and neighboring countries which aims to provide platform to share, exchange and promote the technologies, experiences for the rapid growth and development of capital markets and regional as well as global integration. He is a member of the SEBI committee on corporate governance to help improve the standards of corporate governance of listed companies in India, advisor to Asia-Pacific Investment Council and the Central Board of Direct Taxes (CBDT).

References

Businesspeople from Mumbai
Indian Institute of Management Calcutta alumni
Living people
IIT Bombay alumni
Chief information officers
Indian chief executives
Bombay Stock Exchange
1968 births
National Stock Exchange of India